Paul Robert Thomson (born 15 September 1976) is a Scottish drummer who played for the Glasgow-based band Franz Ferdinand from their formation in 2002 until October 2021.

Thomson has always been interested in music, able to play various instruments such as guitar, keyboard and bass guitar in addition to the drums.

During the late 1990s he was drummer of The Yummy Fur and was at one point part of The Purple Bajengas and Pro Forma. It was in The Yummy Fur that Thomson would meet Alex Kapranos. When The Yummy Fur broke up, Thomson had various odd jobs DJing and working as a nude model at the Glasgow School of Art. He is also the drummer in the Glasgow band Amor, with Luke Fowler, Richard Youngs and Michael Francis Duch. 

In 2001 Thomson joined Franz Ferdinand, originally playing guitar.  He later switched to drums.  He also does backing vocals, and sang lead on the German version of "Tell Her Tonight" from B-side of the "Michael" single. The English version is from Franz Ferdinand.

His record label, NEW! (which started in 2005), only releases material on vinyl records.

Thomson resided in Glasgow, with his now ex-wife Esther (DJ and lead singer of Cash Machine). Together they DJ'd as Polyester (Paul and Esther). They had a baby boy named Georgie in July 2006, and on 19 September 2008 (while Franz Ferdinand were supposed to be headlining a concert) they had another boy and named him Ronnie. Because of Thomson's absence, Franz Ferdinand played a semi-acoustic set and swapped the headlining spot with The Ting Tings. Thomson also has a show on Subcity Radio called "they're only records paul" which runs fortnightly on Thursdays.

On 12 June 2008, it was announced that Thomson was now endorsing Highwood Drums, a UK custom company becoming a Highwood artist.

Thomson is reported to choreograph many of the Franz Ferdinand's videos, including "Do You Want To" and "The Dark of the Matinee", having tap-danced and performed as the Artful Dodger in a West End production of Oliver! as a child. However, in an interview he claimed that this was inserted by himself into Wikipedia for fun.

Paul Thomson is the son of Bert and Ellen Thomson.  He has one sister, Hazel. In 2009, he was voted Scotland's Greatest Ever Drummer by the readers of Dear Scotland.

On 21 October 2021, the band announced on Twitter that Thomson would be leaving Franz Ferdinand after 20 years. The announcement was accompanied by a statement by Thomson and a photograph of him passing his drumsticks to his replacement, Audrey Tait.

References

External links
Franz Ferdinand official site

1976 births
Living people
Musicians from Glasgow
Franz Ferdinand (band) members
Scottish rock drummers
British male drummers
Ivor Novello Award winners
21st-century drummers
The Yummy Fur members
FFS (band) members
American post-punk musicians